The 1990 Southwest Conference baseball tournament was the league's annual postseason tournament used to determine the Southwest Conference's (SWC) automatic bid to the 1990 NCAA Division I baseball tournament. The tournament was held from May 17 through 19 at Disch–Falk Field on the campus of The University of Texas in Austin, Texas.

The number 2 seed  went 3–0 to win the team's 9th SWC tournament under head coach Cliff Gustafson.

Format and seeding 
The tournament featured the top four finishers of the SWC's 8 teams in a double-elimination tournament.

Tournament

References 

Tournament
Southwest Conference Baseball Tournament
Southwest Conference baseball tournament